Bangalore was built at Calcutta in 1792 and took on British registry in 1797 after having made a voyage from Bengal to London under charter to the British East India Company (EIC). She then traded between London and India. She was wrecked in 1802 in the Flores Sea.

Career
On 20 August 1792 Bangalore was under the command of Captain Wilson when a heavy gale drove her across the tail of the Saugor Sand. Charts that accurately described water depths enabled Wilson to navigate into Channel Creek and then to safety in Randall's Cove.

Under the command of Captain James Frayer, Bangalore was at Calcutta on 15 February 1796 and left Bengal on 22 March. She reached Saint Helena on 4 July and Crookhaven on 27 November, before arriving at Blackwall on  17 December.

Bangalore was admitted to the Registry of Great Britain on 17 February 1797. She entered Lloyd's Register in 1798 with J. Friar, master, and Tullock, owner.

One record has Bangalore sailing to Bengal and return between 16 January 1797 and 19 December 1798. 

The New Oriental Register... in 1802 gave her master and owner as Francis Lynch.

Fate
Bangalore was wrecked on 12 April 1802. She was under the command of Captain Lynch  and nine days out from Amboyna. Survivors in the pinnace and jolly boats reached Sourabaya. The Dutch received them kindly and later sent them on to Batavia.

Although the wreck occurred in 1802, Lloyd's Register carried an (unchanged) entry for her to 1805, and the Register of Shipping did so to 1806.

Notes

Citations

References
Bowditch, Nathaniel (1821) The New American Practical Navigator ... Exemplified in a Journal Kept from Boston to Madeira ...: With an Appendix ....(E.M. Blunt). 
 
Mason, Herbert B., ed. (1908) Encyclopaedia of Ships and Shipping. (Shipping Encyclopaedia).
New Oriental Register and East India Directory for 1802 (1802). (London: Black's and Parry).
 
 

1792 ships
British ships built in India
Ships of the British East India Company
Age of Sail merchant ships
Merchant ships of the United Kingdom
Maritime incidents in 1802